Week-End with Father is a 1951 American comedy film directed by Douglas Sirk and starring Van Heflin, Patricia Neal, and Gigi Perreau.

Plot
Their children are leaving New York City for summer camp, so Brad Stubbs wishes his two daughters goodbye and Jean Bowen does likewise with her sons. Neither being currently married, they meet again while walking their dogs, become acquainted, and quickly get engaged.

Brad attempts to break the news to a woman he has been seeing, Phyllis Reynolds, an actress, but she misunderstands. Brad and Jean then travel to the camp to inform their children. Handsome camp counselor Don Adams is instantly attracted to Jean, and the kids mock Brad when he is not as good at camp activities as Don is.

Phyllis shows up, shocking Jean when she claims to be Brad's wife-to-be. In time, the children regret not accepting the new relationship and scheme to bring Brad and Jean back together, her boys even pretending to be lost in the woods so that Brad can be a hero and bring them home.

Cast
 Van Heflin as Brad Stubbs
 Patricia Neal as Jean Bowen
 Gigi Perreau as Anne Stubbs
 Virginia Field as Phyllis Reynolds
 Richard Denning as Don Adams
 Jimmy Hunt as Gary Bowen
 Tommy Rettig as David Bowen
 Janine Perreau as Patty Stubbs
 Gary Pagett as Eddie Lewis 
 Forrest Lewis as Clarence Willett
 Frances E. Williams as Cleo
 Elvia Allman as Mrs. G

See also
 List of American films of 1951

References

External links
 
 

1951 films
Films directed by Douglas Sirk
1951 romantic comedy films
American romantic comedy films
Films scored by Frank Skinner
American black-and-white films
1950s English-language films
1950s American films